Frederick Hooper may refer to:

Frederick Hooper (adventurer), associate of Tryggve Gran
Frederic Hooper (1892–1963) of the Hooper baronets, head of Schweppes
Fred W. Hooper (1897–2000), American racehorse owner and breeder